The lateral condyle is the lateral portion of the upper extremity of tibia.

It serves as the insertion for the biceps femoris muscle (small slip). Most of the tendon of the biceps femoris inserts on the fibula.

See also
 Gerdy's tubercle
 Medial condyle of tibia

Additional images

References

External links
 
 
 

Bones of the lower limb
Tibia